Cessnock Airport  is a civil airport located  North of Cessnock, New South Wales, Australia.

History
Built by the Department of Main Roads during World War II named as RAAF Base Pokolbin, as part of a system of parent and satellite aerodromes proposed throughout New South Wales. The aerodrome was known as RAAF Station Pokolbin.
Principal works undertaken with approximate quantities were: Clearing & grubbing - 148 ha; Earthworks - 3876 cu.m.; Formation & trimming - 277,306 sq.m.; Formation of taxiways - 6040 m; Gravelling of runways - 159,856 sq.m. Gravelling of taxiways and hideouts - 66,560 sq.m.; Tar surfacing - 115,315 sq.m.; and Pipe and stone drains - 4512 m.

The aerodrome was proposed to have the following satellite aerodromes, Glendon, Rothbury and Weston, however, Rothbury and Weston do not appear to have been constructed.

Airport usage
Cessnock Airport is a popular Flight training aerodrome servicing Newcastle and Lower Hunter based pilots and students. It is usually considered so popular due to its large training area, which it shares with Maitland Airport and other Hunter Region aerodromes. It is home to flight schools, such as Phil Unicomb Aviation and Aerohunter Flight Training. The airport is also home to Wirraway Aviation Museum, two helicopter charter companies; Slattery Helicopter Charter and Hunter Valley Helicopters which operate from the Eastern Apron. Early morning Hot air balloon flights are also conducted in close proximity to the aerodrome in the early hours of the day.

See also
 List of airports in New South Wales

References

External links
 

Airports in New South Wales
Airports established in 1942
Air transport in the Hunter Region
City of Cessnock
1942 establishments in Australia